St Georges Basin is a town in the South Coast region of New South Wales, Australia. St George Basin is located on the shores of St Georges Basin, within the City of Shoalhaven.

Prominent residents have included actor Steve Dodd.

References 

Towns in the South Coast (New South Wales)
City of Shoalhaven